PPIE may refer to:
PPIE (gene)
Panama–Pacific International Exposition, 1915 world's fair in California